Babakhanyan or Babakhanian is an Armenian surname derived from the Central Asian name Babakhan. It may refer to:

Arakel Babakhanian, commonly known as Leo (1860–1932), Armenian historian, publicist, writer, critic and professor
Armen Babakhanian, Armenian pianist
David Babakhanyan (born 1975), Armenian film director, producer and screenwriter
Hovhannes Babakhanyan (born 1968), Armenian-American actor and singer

See also
Babakhanov